Landudal is a commune in the Finistère department of Brittany in north-western France. The writer Angèle Jacq, winner of the Cezam Prix Littéraire Inter CE in 2000 for her novel Le voyage de Jabel, was born in Landudal, as was the famed explorer Yves-Joseph de Kerguelen-Trémarec.

Population
Inhabitants of Landudal are called in French Landudalais.

See also
 Communes of the Finistère department

References

External links

 Official website 
 
Mayors of Finistère Association 

Communes of Finistère